The 2013 World Youth Championships in Athletics was the eighth edition of the biennial international athletics competition for youth (under-18) athletes. The five-day competition took place between 10 and 14 July at the RSC Olimpiyskiy stadium in Donetsk, Ukraine.

A record 1532 athletes (840 boys and 713 girls) from 165 nations entered themselves for the competition. Eligible athletes were aged 16 or 17 on 31 December 2013 (born in 1996 or 1997).

Medal summary

Boys

Girls

Medal table

References

External links
 Official results
Official competition website
Official 2013 World Youth Championships website at IAAF
Statistical handbook

IAAF World Youth Championships in Athletics
World Youth Championships in Athletics
World Youth Championships in Athletics

International athletics competitions hosted by Ukraine
Sport in Donetsk